Aneflomorpha wappesi is a species of beetle in the family Cerambycidae. It was described by Chemsak and Noguera in 2005.

References

Aneflomorpha
Beetles described in 2005